× Cattleytonia (from Cattleya and Broughtonia, its parental genera) is an intergeneric hybrid of orchids. It is abbreviated Ctna in horticultural trade.

References 

Orchid nothogenera
Laeliinae